Elections to Pembrokeshire County Council were held on 1 May 2008.   It was preceded by the 2004 election and followed by the 2012 election. On the same day there were elections to the other 21 local authorities in Wales, and to community council elections in Wales. There were also elections elsewhere in the United Kingdom

Overview
All 60 council seats were up for election. The previous council was controlled by Independents as had been the case since the authority was formed in 1995. The Independents retained control in 2008 and Labour achieved its worst result of the four elections fought thus far.

|}

Results

Amroth

Burton

Camrose

Carew

Cilgerran

Clydau

-->

Crymych

Dinas Cross

East Williamston

Fishguard North East

Fishguard North West

-->

Goodwick

-->

Haverfordwest Castle

Haverfordwest Garth

Haverfordwest Portfield

Haverfordwest Prendergast

Haverfordwest Priory

Hundleton

Johnston
Ken Rowlands had been elected as a Labour candidate in 2004.

Kilgetty

Lampeter Velfrey

Lamphey

Letterston

Llangwm

Llanrhian

Maenclochog

Manorbier

Martletwy

Merlin’s Bridge
The winning candidate had stood for Labour in 2004.

Milford Central

Milford East

-->

Milford Hakin

Milford Hubberston

Milford North

Milford West

Narberth

Narberth Rural

Newport

Neyland East

Neyland West

Pembroke Monkton
Peral Llewellyn was elected as a Labour candidate in 2004.

Pembroke St Mary North

Pembroke St Mary South

Pembroke St Michael
The Conservative candidate had won the seat at a by-election in 2007 following the death of the previous member, John Allen.

Pembroke Dock Central

Pembroke Dock Llanion

Pembroke Dock Market

Pembroke Dock Pennar

Penally

Rudbaxton

St David's

St Dogmaels

St Ishmael's

Saundersfoot
Rosemary Hayes was one of the longest serving members of the Council, having represented Saundersfoot on the authority since 1995 and previously been the district councillor on the former South Pembrokeshire District Council for many years. Phil Baker had stood as a Liberal Democrat in 2004.

Scleddau
Alwyn Luke was one of the longest serving members of the Council, having represented Scleddau on the authority since 1995 and previously been the district councillor on the former Preseli Pembrokeshire District Council for many years. David Williams had stood as a Liberal Democrat in 2008.

Solva

Tenby North

Tenby South

The Havens

Wiston

References

2008
Pembrokeshire
21st century in Pembrokeshire